The Renesas R8C is a 16-bit microcontroller that was developed as a smaller and cheaper version of the Renesas M16C. It retains the M16C's 16-bit CISC architecture and instruction set, but trades size for speed by cutting the internal data bus from 16 bits to 8 bits. It is available in a number of different versions with varying amounts of flash memory and SRAM.

Members of the R8C family 
All R8C have an internal ring oscillator and can be used without an external resonator. Common interfaces are UART and some devices have CAN interfaces. Some devices have an internal data flash which is meant as a replacement for a serial EEPROM, although it handles less write cycles as a real serial EEPROM. R8C devices have OCD (On Chip Debugging, see in-circuit emulator). When debugging with the Renesas E8 debugger or E8a debugger, UART 1 cannot be used. The debug interface uses only four wires: Vcc, GND, Reset and Mode.

R8C/11 
8-16k flash memory

R8C/13 
8-16k flash memory

Key features:
4 port I/O
Four Timers (X,Y,Z,C) each other 8 bit, except C timer 16 Bit.plus watch timer 15 bit
10 bit*12 channel A/D converter
8 bit*1 channel UART or clock synchronous serial I/O, plus 8 bit 1 canal UART
System Clock Generator Xin-X out (High-Low Speed On Chip Oscillator)
CPU Core And more Memory

R8C/18 
4-16k flash memory

R8C/19 
4-16k flash memory

R8C/1A 
4-16k flash memory

R8C/1B 
4-16k flash memory

R8C/20 
32-128k flash memory

R8C/21 
32-48k flash memory

R8C/22 
32-48k flash memory
CAN interface

R8C/23 
32-48k flash memory
CAN interface

R8C/24 
16-32kbyte flash memory

R8C/25 
16-32k flash memory

R8C/26 
8-32k flash memory

R8C/27 
8-32k flash memory

R8C/28 
8-16k flash memory

R8C/29 
8-16k flash memory

R8C/2A 
48-96k flash memory

R8C/2B 
48-96k flash memory

R8C/2C 
48-96k flash memory

R8C/2D  
48-96k flash memory

R8C/33

See also 
M16C
M32C

External links 
Renesas R8C product page
 http://www.RenesasInteractive.com - Online training for Renesas products
 http://www.RenesasRulz.com - A community support forum.
 http://www.kpitgnutools.com  Official free M16C GNU Toolchain with Free Support
 Online Tutorial (Clubelek)

Renesas microcontrollers